Relíquias is a Portuguese parish in the municipality of Odemira. The population in 2011 was 931, in an area of 120.08 km2.

References

Freguesias of Odemira